Sekol may refer to:
Skou language
Sekol-ri, North Korea
Sekol, Iran, a village in Hormozgan Province, Iran